Dashti Obburdon (Tajik: Дашти Оббурдон) is a village in Sughd Region, northwestern Tajikistan. It is part of the jamoat Ivan-Tojik in the Kuhistoni Mastchoh District. Population — 832 people (2017).

References

 Taqsimoti ma'murii Tojikiston (Administrative division of Tajikistan), Dushanbe, SIEMT, 2017, in 580 p. ISBN 978-99947-33-68-2

Populated places in Sughd Region